The Rochester Knighthawks were a lacrosse team based in Rochester, New York, that played in the National Lacrosse League (NLL). The 2010 season was the 16th in franchise history.

Regular season

Conference standings

Game log
Reference:

Transactions

New players
 Aaron Bold - acquired in trade
 John Grant, Jr. - returning from injury
 Peter Jacobs - acquired in trade
 Cody Johnson - acquired in trade
 Ian Rubel - acquired in trade
 Regy Thorpe - resigned as General Manager to resume playing

Players not returning
 Sandy Chapman - traded

Trades

Entry draft
The 2009 NLL Entry Draft took place on September 9, 2009. The Knighthawks selected the following players:

Roster

See also
2010 NLL season

References

Rochester Knighthawks seasons
Rochester
Rochester Knighthawks